Morgantown is a town at the intersection of Indiana state routes 135 and 252 in Jackson Township, Morgan County, in the U.S. state of Indiana. The population was 986 at the 2010 census.

History

Morgantown was founded by Robert Bowles and Samuel Teeters, who first laid out 52 lots in the month of March, 1831. A post office has been in operation at Morgantown since 1833.

The Morgantown Historic District was listed on the National Register of Historic Places in 2006.

Geography
Morgantown is located at  (39.373646, -86.260610).

Demographics

2010 census
As of the census of 2010, there were 986 people, 374 households, and 236 families living in the town. The racial makeup of the town was 98.5% White, 0.1% African American, 0.4% Native American, 0.2% Asian, 0.3% from other races, and 0.5% from two or more races. Hispanic or Latino of any race were 0.4% of the population.

There were 374 households, of which 36.1% had children under the age of 18 living with them, 43.3% were married couples living together, 15.0% had a female householder with no husband present, 4.8% had a male householder with no wife present, and 36.9% were non-families. 31.0% of all households were made up of individuals, and 13.6% had someone living alone who was 65 years of age or older. The average household size was 2.54 and the average family size was 3.18.

The median age in the town was 37.9 years. 26.5% of residents were under the age of 18; 7.7% were between the ages of 18 and 24; 26.3% were from 25 to 44; 23.5% were from 45 to 64; and 16.1% were 65 years of age or older. The gender makeup of the town was 47.6% male and 52.4% female.

2000 census
As of the census of 2000, there were 964 people, 366 households, and 259 families living in the town. The racial makeup of the town was 99.17% White, 0.31% African American, 0.31% Native American, 0.10% from other races, and 0.10% from two or more races. Hispanic or Latino of any race were 0.62% of the population.

There were 366 households, out of which 34.4% had children under the age of 18 living with them, 57.4% were married couples living together, 10.9% had a female householder with no husband present, and 29.2% were non-families. 26.2% of all households were made up of individuals, and 13.4% had someone living alone who was 65 years of age or older. The average household size was 2.51 and the average family size was 3.05.

In the town, the population was spread out, with 25.6% under the age of 18, 7.7% from 18 to 24, 29.1% from 25 to 44, 20.6% from 45 to 64, and 16.9% who were 65 years of age or older. The median age was 35 years. For every 100 females, there were 86.5 males. For every 100 females age 18 and over, there were 80.2 males.

The median income for a household in the town was $33,158, and the median income for a family was $45,385. Males had a median income of $31,066 versus $23,068 for females. The per capita income for the town was $17,504. About 2.2% of families and 8.3% of the population were below the poverty line, including 2.6% of those under age 18 and 31.3% of those age 65 or over.

Education
Morgantown has a public library, a branch of the Morgan County Public Library.

References

External links

 Town website

Towns in Morgan County, Indiana
Towns in Indiana
Indianapolis metropolitan area